Lepidoblepharis hoogmoedi, also known commonly as Hoogmoed's scaly-eyed gecko and the spotted dwarf gecko, is a species of gecko, a lizard in the family Sphaerodactylidae. The species is endemic to northern South America.

Etymology
The specific name, hoogmoedi, is in honor of Dutch herpetologist Marinus Steven Hoogmoed (born 1942).

Geographic range
L. hoogmoedi is found in northwestern Brazil (Amazonas) and northern Peru.

Reproduction
L. hoogmoedi is oviparous.

References

Further reading
Ávila-Pires MCS (1995). "Lizards of Brazilian Amazonia (Reptilia: Squamata)". Zoologische Verhandelingen, Leiden 299: 1–706. (Lepidoblepharis hoogmoedi, new species, pp. 294–298, Figures 95–97, 271). (in English, with abstracts in Portuguese and Spanish).

Lepidoblepharis
Reptiles of Brazil
Reptiles of Peru
Reptiles described in 1995